Woodbine Schools or variation, may refer to:

 Woodbine Middle School, Toronto, Ontario, Canada; the junior high school division of Georges Vanier Secondary School
 Woodbine Normal and Grade School, Woodbine, Iowa, USA
 Woodbine Community School District, Woodbine, Iowa, USA
 Woodbine School District, Woodbine New Jersey, USA

See also
 Woodbine (disambiguation)